Biaggi is an Italian surname. Notable people with the surname include:

Alessandra Biaggi (born 1986), American politician
Federico Biaggi (born 1987), Italian motorcycle racer
Ingrid Vila Biaggi (born 1974), Puerto Rican engineer
Mario Biaggi (1917–2015), American politician and police officer
Max Biaggi (born 1971), Italian motorcycle racer
Olivier Biaggi (born 1971), Swiss football player

See also
Augusto Gansser-Biaggi (1910–2012), Swiss geologist

Italian-language surnames